La Sagrera is a neighborhood of Barcelona.

Geography 
La Sagrera is bordered to the north by Sant Andreu del Palomar and to the east by the neighborhood of La Verneda; included by the south end is the zone named Navas, and to the west the Congress area.

History 
This name La Sagrera dates to the 11th century when the farmers of Catalonia lived under the feudal system. The Abbot Oliba, seeing the need to protect farmers, created a space of 30 acres around the churches in which people and goods would be secured from assault. In these spaces, the farmers built some small buildings called  in Catalan, which they used to store their harvests.

The population remained small for centuries, and by 1877 only some 48 houses could be found in the settlement's core. From the last third of the 19th century, the area became an industrial neighborhood, dominated by metallurgy and textile sectors. The name  was retained only for the core zone of pre-existing housing.

By 1885 the connection linked  with Barcelona, strengthened by the 1901 electrification of the line. The industrialisation of the district saw the opening of the factory  in 1911 (renamed ENASA in 1946). Currently, a group of apartment buildings, schools and a park named  is there. In this (continuing) process, houses and workshops have been replaced by many blocks of apartments.

The transformation of the neighbourhood continues, particularly with Sagrera railway station, currently under constriction, which will link up the Barcelona Metro with local, regional and high-speed rail, with urban buses and with taxi services. The neighbourhood of La Sagrera is well-supported by underground transport, with  R3 and R4, plus Metro lines L1, L5, L9 and L10, (the last two under construction).

Popular culture 

Since 2003, La Sagrera has had a "gegantera group". The so-called "gegants", which translates as "Giants", are a popular folk that amuse children throughout Catalonia. A gang of such giants is found in La Sagrera.

Entities 
 Drac i Diables de la Sagrera
 Colla Gegantera de la Sagrera
 Esbart L'Estel de la Sagrera
 Associació Esportiva Districte IX Sant Andreu
 Centre de Documentació de la Sagrera
 Esplai 'la Sagrera'

Also to see 
 Archaeologic zone of the Sagrera

External links 
 La Sagrera, a la web de l'Ajuntament
 Biblioteca La Sagrera-Marina Clotet
 Comissió de Festes de La Sagrera
 Colla Gegantera de La Sagrera
 Centre de Documentació de la Sagrera
 Drac i Diables de la Sagrera

Neighbourhoods of Barcelona
Sant Andreu